Pièces de viole were collections of suites for bass viol and usually continuo written by several French Baroque composers, most notably Marin Marais, whose five Livres form a core of the viol repertoire. 
Early pièces did not include continuo parts; examples of these may be found in the oeuvres of Sieur de Sainte-Colombe and Nicolas Hotman. Derived from lute and theorbo music, they often featured preludes sans mesures, and virtuosic bowed trills, whilst remaining French in their dance rhythms and melodies. Formally they also mirrored the pièces de clavecin being written by virtuoso harpsichordists.
Marais and his contemporaries further established a uniquely French tradition of virtuosic pieces for viol and continuo. The pièces were typically written in dance forms like the Allemande, Gavotte, Sarabande, and Gigue, augmented by a Prélude or a Fantaisie and with additional character pieces like Plaintes and Tombeaux.

The French pièce de viole is also recognizable by the trend, brought to perfection by Marais, of the composer including detailed directions for performance in the score. Ornaments, bowings, dynamics, and incredibly specific fingerings make this repertoire a veritable time capsule for modern performers to explore. Marais went so far as to distinguish between two different kinds of vibrato and direct which chords should be “broken”. This particular repertoire is one of the first to have such consistent attention paid to giving directions for technical execution, in contrast to the vast majority of contemporaneous compositional practices. It is all the more remarkable given the inherently costly and labour-intensive business of printing and publishing sheet music at that time.

Composers who wrote Pièces de viole:

 Sieur de Sainte-Colombe
Sieur de Sainte-Colombe le Fils
Marin Marais
Sieur de Machy
Sieur de Danoville
François Couperin
Louis de Caix d'Hervelois
Joseph Bodin de Boismortier
Antoine Forqueray
Jean-Baptiste Forqueray
Charles Dollé
Roland Marais

Compositions for viol